James Arthur Spencer, Jr. (born March 29, 1969) is an American former college and professional football player who was a cornerback in the National Football League (NFL) for twelve seasons during the 1990s and early 2000s.  Spencer played college football for the University of Florida, and thereafter, he played professionally for the New Orleans Saints, Cincinnati Bengals, San Diego Chargers and Denver Broncos of the NFL.

Early years 

Spencer was born in Manning, South Carolina.  He attended Glades Central High School in Belle Glade, Florida, and he played high school football for the Glades Central Raiders.

College career 

Spencer accepted an athletic scholarship to attend the University of Florida in Gainesville, Florida, where he played for coach Galen Hall and coach Steve Spurrier's Florida Gators football teams from 1988 to 1990.  In 1990, he blocked a punt late in the fourth quarter, which Richard Fain recovered and returned twenty-five yards for a touchdown and providing the margin of victory in the Gators' 17–13 victory over the Alabama Crimson Tide in Tuscaloosa, Alabama.  Spencer decided to forgo his final year of NCAA eligibility after his junior season in 1990, and made himself eligible for the NFL Draft.

Professional career 

The Washington Redskins selected Spencer in the eighth round (215th pick overall) of the 1991 NFL Draft.

In his twelve NFL seasons, Spencer played in 177 regular season games, and started eighty-one of them.  He finished his NFL career with twenty-six interceptions, two touchdown returns, eight fumble recoveries and one fumble recovery for a touchdown.

In 2003, Spencer worked as an assistant defensive back coach with the Broncos in addition to playing, making him the first simultaneous player/coach in the NFL since Dan Reeves in 1972.

See also 

 Florida Gators football, 1980–89
 Florida Gators football, 1990–99
 History of the Denver Broncos
 List of Florida Gators in the NFL Draft
 List of New Orleans Saints players

References

Bibliography 
 Carlson, Norm, University of Florida Football Vault: The History of the Florida Gators, Whitman Publishing, LLC, Atlanta, Georgia (2007).  .
 Golenbock, Peter, Go Gators!  An Oral History of Florida's Pursuit of Gridiron Glory, Legends Publishing, LLC, St. Petersburg, Florida (2002).  .
 Hairston, Jack, Tales from the Gator Swamp: A Collection of the Greatest Gator Stories Ever Told, Sports Publishing, LLC, Champaign, Illinois (2002).  .
 McCarthy, Kevin M.,  Fightin' Gators: A History of University of Florida Football, Arcadia Publishing, Mount Pleasant, South Carolina (2000).  .
 Nash, Noel, ed., The Gainesville Sun Presents The Greatest Moments in Florida Gators Football, Sports Publishing, Inc., Champaign, Illinois (1998).  

1969 births
Living people
People from Belle Glade, Florida
People from Manning, South Carolina
Sportspeople from the Miami metropolitan area
Players of American football from Florida
Players of American football from South Carolina
American football cornerbacks
Florida Gators football players
New Orleans Saints players
Cincinnati Bengals players
San Diego Chargers players
Denver Broncos players